Charles d'Authier de Rochefort (7 July 1887 – 31 January 1952) was a French film actor, principally of the silent era. He appeared in 34 films between 1911 and 1932. He also directed seven films between 1930 and 1931.

Early life 
De Rochefort was born in Port-Vendres, Pyrénées-Orientales, France. He was the son of Paul Charles Dominique d'Authier de Rochefort and Camille Caroline Rose Félicité Guelfucci.

Career 

He portrayed Pharaoh Rameses II in the biblical prologue of Cecil B. DeMille's silent film The Ten Commandments (1923).

Among the films he directed was the French-language version of Paramount on Parade (1930), and Magie moderne (1931), a French film about television released as Televisione in Italy, along with five other versions in five different languages. This latter film was produced at the Joinville Studios of Paramount Pictures at Joinville-le-Pont in Paris.

In 1943 he wrote the book Le Film de Mes Souvenirs (Secrets de Vedettes).

Personal life 
During the Second World War he was interned by the German occupiers but was released due to the influence of his friend, the actress Michèle Alfa.

Death 
He died 31 January 1952 in Paris, France.

Selected filmography
 The Mask of Horror (1912)
 Fille du peuple (1920)
 The Spanish Jade (1922)
 The Black Diamond (1922)
 Law of the Lawless (1923)
 The Cheat (1923)
 Hollywood (1923) cameo appearance
 The Marriage Maker (1923)
 The Ten Commandments (1923)
 The White Moth (1924)
 Shadows of Paris (1924)
 Love and Glory (1924)
 The Princess and the Clown (1924)
 Madame Sans-Gene (1925) with Gloria Swanson
 Paramount en parade (1930) director; French-language version of Paramount on Parade
 Television (1931)
 Magie moderne (1931) co-director with Dimitri Buchowetzki; other versions released by Paramount: in Dutch (De Sensatie van de Toekomst), Italian (Televisione), Swedish (Tradlost och karleksfullt), Polish (Swiat bez grnic), Czech (Svet bez hranic), and Romanian (Televiziune) versions
 Southern Cross (1932)

References

External links

Photographs and literature

1887 births
1952 deaths
French male film actors
French male silent film actors
French film directors
20th-century French male actors
People from Pyrénées-Orientales